Coopersville, New York may refer to:

 Coopersville, Clinton County, New York
 Coopersville, Livingston County, New York